XSP is a simple, standalone web server written in C# that hosts ASP.NET's System for Linux and other Unix operating systems. It runs on the Mono runtime for Linux and the .NET Framework runtime, making it usable as a lightweight web server on any platform supporting .NET.

XSP was the original name of the internal project at Microsoft that became ASP.NET. The name pays homage to the original name of what became ASP.NET.

See also
mod_mono

References

Further reading

External links
 
 

Mono (software)
.NET programming tools
Microsoft free software
Software using the MS-PL license
Linux-only free software